Lake Placid Serenade is a 1944 American musical romance film directed by Steve Sekely and starring Vera Ralston, Eugene Pallette and Barbara Jo Allen. Following the German invasion of Czechoslovakia a Czech ice-skating champion goes to stay with her Uncle in the United States.

It was made by Republic Pictures as a slightly higher-budget production than most of the studios' B Movies. The film's sets were designed by the art director Russell Kimball.

Plot 
Vera Haschek (Vera Ralston), training for the Czechoslovak national figure skating championship, is given a pair of hand-made skates by her Grandfather (Lloyd Corrigan). She wins the contest, impressing the Countess (Barbara Jo Allen), an ice show impresario. She tries to sign Vera to a long-term contract, but Vera resists. The Countess puts Vera in a show at the Ice Carnival in Lake Placid, New York, and Vera becomes an audience favourite.

When Vera learns that Nazi Germany has invaded Czechoslovakia, she is worried about her grandfather. She learns she has a rich uncle, Carl Cermak (Eugene Pallette), living in the United States. She seeks him out at his Long Island home, and is welcomed into his family. Her cousin Susan (Ruth Terry) is happy to see her, but her cousin Irene (Stephanie Bachelor) snubs her. Vera meets Paul Jordan (obert Livingston), her uncle's business partner. The two fall in love, but Paul leaves the next day for a business meeting—neither having told the other their name. Meanwhile, Irene, who is infatuated with Paul, gives him a pipe for Christmas. When Paul meets Vera again a week later, she sees the pipe and believes she is stealing Paul from Irene. She flees the Cermak home and returns to Lake Placid.

Susan, realizing that Paul and Vera are in love, arranges for Paul to go to Lake Placid and tricks him into meeting Vera. She again flees the meeting, leaving one of her special skates behind. Vera now agrees to sign the contract with the Countess; her one condition is that her real name never be used. She goes on tour, and is a huge hit.

Meanwhile, Uncle Carl has located Vera's grandfather and brought him to the United States. Uncle Carl sees Vera's photo in an advertisement for an ice show, and brings Grandfather and Paul to the show. Paul returns Vera's skate. Irene admits that Paul doesn't love her, and Vera and Paul are happily reunited.

Cast 
 Vera Ralston as Vera Haschek
 Eugene Pallette as Carl Cermak
 Barbara Jo Allen as The Countess
 Robert Livingston as Paul Jordan
 Stephanie Bachelor as Irene Cermak
 Walter Catlett as Carlton Webb
 Lloyd Corrigan as Jaroslaw 'Papa' Haschek
 Ruth Terry as Susan Cermak
 William Frawley as Jiggers
 John Litel as Walter Benda
 Ferdinand Munier as Kris Kringle
 Roy Rogers as himself
 John Dehner as Radio Announcer (uncredited)
 Frank Mayo as Reporter (uncredited)

See also 
List of American films of 1944

References

Bibliography 
  Len D. Martin. The Republic Pictures Checklist: Features, Serials, Cartoons, Short Subjects and Training Films of Republic Pictures Corporation, 1935–1959. McFarland, 1998.

External links 
 

1944 films
1940s romantic musical films
American romantic musical films
Films directed by Steve Sekely
Republic Pictures films
Films set in the Czech Republic
Films set in the 1930s
Figure skating films
American black-and-white films
1940s English-language films
1940s American films